Free weight(s) may refer to:

 Free mass, the mass of a molecule
 Free weight (equipment), weight training equipment that is not connected to an external apparatus